DNA Productions, Inc. was an American animation studio and production company founded in 1987 by John A. Davis and Keith Alcorn, which is best known for its comedy films. It also provided directing, script writing, and production to its clients.

History
DNA Productions was formed in Dallas by John A. Davis and Keith Alcorn in 1987, after they left their positions at K & H Productions (formerly Keitz & Herndon, Inc.), a locally based animation company. Up until 1997, DNA Productions had only six employees and was involved in the production of commercials. The company also did work for other companies.

In 1999, the studio teamed up with The Curiosity Company and Fox Television Studios to make a holiday special for television entitled Olive, the Other Reindeer, which was nominated in the Emmy awards and also joined production with Steve Oedekerk's O Entertainment on the CG Christmas special, Santa vs. the Snowman 3D.

Starting in 1998, the studio pitched an idea of Jimmy Neutron to Nickelodeon in the form of a pilot episode called "Runaway Rocketboy", which led to the development and production of the feature film, Jimmy Neutron: Boy Genius, which was later nominated for an Academy Award, and the television series The Adventures of Jimmy Neutron, Boy Genius that was held in original airings from 2002 to 2006. In 2006, DNA Productions completed The Ant Bully, a feature film loosely based on the children's book of the same name, while production on The Adventures of Jimmy Neutron, Boy Genius was ending. DNA was unable to find another project afterwards, so the studio's facility closed later that year.

Mascots
Until 2002, the studio's mascot was formerly a purple cat with two tails in a DNA spiral formation named Helix the Cat. From 2002 to 2006, Helix the Cat was replaced by a computer-animated, three-eyed chimpanzee named Paul, named after and voiced by one of their employees Paul Claerhout.

Work

Television
 Basic Values: Sex, Shock & Censorship in the 1990s (1993) (co-production with Imagination Productions)
 Attack of the 5 Ft. 2 In. Women (1994) (title animation)
 A.J.'s Time Travelers (1994-1995) (co-production with Gold Coast Company Entertainment)
 Saturday Night Special (1996) ("The Spooners" shorts)
 The O Show (1997) (co-production with O Entertainment)
 Santa vs. the Snowman (1997) (co-production with O Entertainment)
 The Weird Al Show (1997) (animation)
 Cartoon Sushi (1997–1998) (co-production with a.k.a. Cartoon and MTV Animation)
 Jingaroo (1998-1999) (direct-to-video; co-production with Beckett Entertainment)
 Olive, the Other Reindeer (1999) (co-production with The Curiosity Company, Flower Films and Fox Television Studios)
 The Adventures of Jimmy Neutron, Boy Genius (2002–2006) (co-production with O Entertainment and Nickelodeon Animation Studio)
 " The Garfield Show" (2009-2016) (Co-production with O Entertainment and Nick Jr Productions
 The Jimmy Timmy Power Hour (2004-2006) (co-production with O Entertainment, Frederator Studios and Nickelodeon Animation Studio)

Films
 Macon County War (1990) (music)
 The Nanna & Lil' Puss Puss Show (1994)
 The Dark Dealer (1995) (special effects)
 Barney's Sense-Sational Day (1996) (animated backgrounds)
 Barney's Adventure Bus (1997) (animated backgrounds)

Short films
 Nanna and Lil' Puss Puss (1991-2001)
 The Tale of Nippoless Nippleby (1992)
 Foul Play (1993)
 Beat the Meatles (1996)
 No Neck Joe (1997-1998)
 The Adventures of Johnny Quasar (1995)
 Elroy's Toy (1995) (direct-to-video compilation; co-production with Third Planet Productions)
 Jimmy Neutron: Boy Genius: Runaway Rocketboy! (1998) (co-production with O Entertainment and Nickelodeon Animation Studio)

References

External links
 Official website
 DNA Productions at Internet Movie Database

 
1987 establishments in Texas
2006 disestablishments in Texas
American companies established in 1987
American companies disestablished in 2006
Mass media companies established in 1987
Mass media companies disestablished in 2006
American animation studios
Companies based in Dallas
Film production companies of the United States